Efraín Medina Berry Vargas (born May 25, 1979 in Pachuca, Hidalgo) is a Mexican singer who participated in and was among the final three contestants of the first season of Latin American Idol.

The Oldest of 4 Brothers: Lorena, Cristina y Alan. Since he was a Child he has liked music, specially "ranchera" and he demonstrated it by studying singing, solfeggio and piano, besides movement, scenic development, literary composition and acting. " I have 
always liked to sing very much, when I was a child I was always organizing festivals for my family or in the school, always I liked the music but I had not decided to dedicate myself professionally, it was just at my 18 years when I began with a performance in a restaurant in Pachuca, from that time, and to do a career, I had studied singing, acting, and when I felt prepared I did continue", those are Efraín's own words about his beginnings. Nevertheless, our idol have studied and graduated at the UNAM (National Autonomous University of Mexico) in the career of administration and did his specialization in marketing.

Efras (as is called by his relatives) have recorded a cd  “homemade but from the heart” like he had expressed, interpreting rancheras song's. And as if that was just little, he also  make his debut in the musical theatre as Chris Perez (husband of the honoured one) in the musical "Selena" starring Lidia Ávila.

External links
Official MySpace
Interview after Latin American idol

1979 births
Latin American Idol participants
Musicians from Hidalgo (state)
Living people
21st-century Mexican singers
21st-century Mexican male singers